Governor Hay may refer to:

Edward Drummond-Hay (Royal Navy officer) (1815–1884), governor of Madras from 1842 to 1848
James Shaw Hay (1839–1924), acting governor of Sierra Leone at various times between 1886 and 1891, and 3rd Governor of Barbados from 1891 to 1900
Marion E. Hay (1865–1933), governor of Washington from 1910 to 1913